The year 1995 was the 24th year after the independence of Bangladesh. It was the fifth year of the first term of the government of Khaleda Zia.

Incumbents

 President: Abdur Rahman Biswas
 Prime Minister: Khaleda Zia
 Chief Justice:
 until 31 January: Shahabuddin Ahmed
 1 February – 1 May: M.H. Rahman
 starting 1 May: A.T.M Afzal

Demography

Climate

Economy

Note: For the year 1995 average official exchange rate for BDT was 40.28 per US$.

Events
 16 February – The Government of Bangladesh enacted the Bangladesh Environment Conservation Act. 
 24 August – Rape and murder of 14-year-old Yasmin Akhter by members of Bangladesh Police resulted in mass protests in Dinajpur.
 16 September – Nationwide strikes take place across Bangladesh in protest against the government of Khaleda Zia.

Awards and Recognitions

Independence Day Award

Ekushey Padak
Ahmed Rafiq (literature)
Rawshan Jamil (dance)
Mustafa Zaman Abbasi (music)
Rathindranath Roy (music)
Abdul Karim (education)
Iajuddin Ahmed (education)
Nizamuddin Ahmad (journalism)
Shykh Seraj (journalism)

Sports
 South Asian (Federation) Games:
 Bangladesh participated in the 1995 South Asian Federation Games in Madras, India from 18–27 December. With 7 golds, 17 silvers and 34 bronzes Bangladesh ended the tournament at the fourth position in overall points table.
 International football:
 Bangladesh participated in 1995 South Asian Gold Cup, where they lost to India in the Semi-finals.
 Domestic football:
 Abahani Ltd. won Dhaka League title while Mohammedan SC became runner-up.
 Mohammedan SC & Abahani Ltd. jointly won the title of Bangladesh Federation Cup.
 Cricket:
 Bangladesh participated in the 1995 Asia Cup held in Sharjah, UAE and lost all 3 of their matches.

Births
 11 March – Masbah Ahmmed, sprinter
 3 April – Taskin Ahmed, cricketer
 6 September – Mustafizur Rahman, cricketer
 10 December – Mosaddek Hossain, cricketer

Deaths
 10 February – Leila Arjumand Banu, singer (b. 1929)
 19 October – Jahurul Islam, entrepreneur (b. 1928)
 29 December – Monajatuddin, journalist (b. 1945)

See also 
 1990s in Bangladesh
 List of Bangladeshi films of 1995
 Timeline of Bangladeshi history

References